Harsh Deo Malaviya (1917-1989) was a journalist and economist with socialist ideas. He participated in the Quit India Movement and was imprisoned several times. He was a close associate of Acharya Narendra Dev.

He authored a number of books on articles on land reforms, non-alignment, Indo-African issues and world peace. He represented the State of Uttar Pradesh in Rajya Sabha from 1972-8.

Bibliography
 Socialist Ideology of Congress. A Study in Its Evolution. (1966)
 Indian National Congress: A Brief History (1974)

References

20th-century Indian economists
Journalists from Uttar Pradesh
Writers from Allahabad
Quit India Movement
Rajya Sabha members from Uttar Pradesh
1917 births
1989 deaths
Politicians from Allahabad
Indian male journalists